Millas Mirakel was a pop group from Halmstad, Sweden, scoring chart successes in Sweden during the late 1980s. One of their more famous songs were Rytmen av ett regn.

Discography

Albums
 1987 - Stillbilder
 1989 - Hög puls!

Singles
 1987 - Rytmen av ett regn / Nyfallen gloria
 1989 - Snälla flickor kommer till himmelen...vi andra kommer hur långt som helst / Tom ficka
 1989 - Ensam i september / Minnet av din kropp

References 

Halmstad
Swedish pop music groups